Julio César Chalar (died 5 March 2016) was a Uruguayan lawyer and judge.

He had been a member of the Supreme Court of Justice since December 2012.

References

21st-century Uruguayan judges
20th-century Uruguayan lawyers
Supreme Court of Uruguay justices
2016 deaths
Year of birth missing